R.B.K. Project High School (Deo) full name Rani Brajraj Kumari Project High School, Deo is a notable government girls' high school. It is a Board and Intermediate of Education school and college in Deo, Bihar, India. It was established in 1972. The college,  approved by Bihar School Examination Board for Board (10th) and Intermediate (12th), and affiliated to the Ministry of Human Resource Development.

See also
 R.J. High School (Deo)
 List of teacher education schools in India

References

External links

Deo, Bihar
Schools in Deo, Bihar
1972 establishments in Bihar
Educational institutions established in 1972